The Etymologicon: A Circular Stroll through the Hidden Connections of the English Language is a non-fiction book by English writer Mark Forsyth published in 2011. The book presents the surprising origin of everyday words used in English, with each definition being thematically linked to the next to provide a flowing narrative unlike reference books on etymology. The content of the book was derived from the author's blog, The Inky Fool.

The book was chosen and adapted in December 2011 by BBC Radio 4 for its Book of the Week series. After being featured on the radio, the book became the 2011 Christmas best-seller in the UK.

References

2011 non-fiction books
Etymology
British non-fiction books
Icon Books books